Khalil Georges Khamis (born 12 January 1995) is a Lebanese professional footballer who plays as a centre-back for  club Ahed.

Club career
On 13 February 2020, Khamis joined Malaysian side Pahang on a season-long loan from Ahed.

Honours
Ahed
 AFC Cup: 2019
 Lebanese Premier League: 2014–15, 2016–17, 2017–18, 2018–19, 2021–22
 Lebanese FA Cup: 2017–18, 2018–19
 Lebanese Elite Cup: 2015; runner-up: 2021
 Lebanese Super Cup: 2015, 2017, 2018, 2019

Individual
 Lebanese Premier League Team of the Season: 2014–15, 2015–16, 2018–19

References

External links

 
 
 
 
 

1995 births
Living people
People from Zahle
Lebanese Christians
Lebanese footballers
Association football central defenders
Lebanese Premier League players
Al Ahed FC players
Lebanese expatriate footballers
Expatriate footballers in Malaysia
Lebanese expatriate sportspeople in Malaysia
Malaysia Super League players
Sri Pahang FC players
Lebanon international footballers
Lebanon youth international footballers
AFC Cup winning players